The 29th House of Representatives of Puerto Rico is the lower house of the 17th Legislative Assembly of Puerto Rico and will meet from January 14, 2013, to January 8, 2017. All members were elected in the General Elections of 2012. The House has a majority of members from the Popular Democratic Party (PPD).

The body is counterparted by the 25th Senate of Puerto Rico in the upper house.

Composition

Leadership

Non-officers

Members

Changes in membership
 January 31, 2013: Jorge Colberg Toro resigns from his position as representative at-large in order to become Secretary of Public Affairs at the Office of the Governor.
 March 21, 2013: Piti Gándara fills the vacancy left by Jorge Colberg Toro.
 July 16, 2013: Eduardo Ferrer resigns from his position as representative at-large while the House is adjourned citing, "situations that cannot be delegated that I cannot leave unattended". This effectively left both his seat and the Majority Whip —position Ferrer held— vacant for about a month as the House had to wait to begin its ordinary session to replace him since no extraordinary session was invoked in between by neither the governor nor the speaker.
 August 19, 2013: Manuel Natal fills the vacancy left by Eduardo Ferrer as representative at-large for the Popular Democratic Party while Carlos Bianchi Angleró is elected as Majority Whip.
 October 23, 2014: Yashira Lebrón Rodríguez fills the vacancy left by Antonio "Toñito" Silva as representative for District 8 for the New Progressive Party (PNP) after Silva resigns from his position.

Commissions

Standing commissions

! scope=col style="text-align: left" | Name
! scope=col style="text-align: left" | President
! scope=col style="text-align: left" | Vice President
! scope=col style="text-align: left" | Secretary
|-
| Agriculture, Natural Resources, and Environmental Affairs
| César Hernández Alfonzo
| Tony Rodriguez Quiles
| Lydia Méndez Silva
|-
| Calendars and Special Rules of Debate
| Charlie Hernández
| N/A
| N/A
|-
| Consumer Affairs and Anti-Monopolistic Practices
| Nelson Torres Yordán
| Ángel Matos García
| Piti Gándara
|-
| Cooperatives and Nonprofit Organizations
| Sonia Pacheco
| José Luis Báez
| Carlos Vargas Ferrer
|-
| Development of the Metropolitan Region
| Luis Raúl Torres Cruz
| Sonia Pacheco
| José Luis Báez
|-
| Development of the Tourism Industry
| Ángel Matos García
| Efraín de Jesús
| Carlos Bianchi Angleró
|-
| Education for the Promotion of Arts and Culture
| Brenda López de Arrarás
| Sonia Pacheco
| Piti Gándara
|-
| Ethics
| Nelson Torres Yordán
| N/A
| César Hernández Alfonzo
|-
| Federal and International Affairs and Veterans' Affairs
| vacant
| Ángel Matos García
| Rafael Hernández Montañez
|-
| Government
| Conny Varela
| José Luis Báez
| Nelson Torres Yordán
|-
| Health
| Lydia Méndez Silva
| Piti Gándara
| Narden Jaime Espinosa
|-
| Housing and Urban Development
| Carlos Vargas Ferrer
| Armando Franco
| Luis Ortíz Lugo
|-
| Integrated Development of the Eastern Region
| Narden Jaime Espinosa
| Ramón Luis Cruz
| Javier Aponte Dalmau
|-
| Integrated Development of the Northern Region
| Armando Franco
| César Hernández Alfonzo
| Tony Rodríguez Quiles
|-
| Integrated Development of the South Center Region
| Luis Raúl Torres
| Carlos Vargas Ferrer
| Jesús Santa Rodríguez
|-
| Integrated Development of the Southern Region
| Cacho Vassallo
| Nelson Torres Yordán
| Lydia Méndez Silva
|-
| Integrated Development of the Western Region
| Efraín de Jesús
| Carlos Bianchi Angleró
| Tony Rodríguez Quiles
|-
| Internal Affairs
| Pito Torres
| Conny Varela
| Luis Raúl Torres Cruz
|-
| Judiciary
| Luis Vega Ramos
| Nelson Torres Yordán
| Efraín de Jesús
|-
| Labor and Public Service Retirement Systems
| Jesús Santa Rodríguez
| Rafael Hernández Montañez
| Luis Raúl Torres Cruz
|-
| Municipal Affairs and Regionalization
| Tony Rodríguez Quiles
| Narden Jaime Espinosa
| Carlos Vargas Ferrer
|-
| Public Safety and for the Development of Initiatives Against Crime and Corruption
| José Luis Báez
| Tony Rodríguez Quiles
| Nelson Torres Yordán
|-
| Small and Medium Businesses, Commerce, Industry, and Telecommunications
| Javier Aponte Dalmau
| Luis Raúl Torres
| César Hernández Alfonzo
|-
| Social Welfare and for the Eradication of Poverty
| Piti Gándara
| Lydia Méndez Silva
| Brenda López de Arrarás
|-
| Socioeconomic Development and Planning
| Luis Raúl Torres
| Javier Aponte Dalmau
| Sonia Pacheco
|-
| Transportation and Infrastructure
| Carlos Bianchi Angleró
| Jesús Santa Rodríguez
| Ramón Luis Cruz
|-
| Treasury and Budget
| Tatito Hernández
| César Hernández Alfonzo
| Conny Varela
|-
| Women's Affairs and Equality
| Brenda López de Arrarás
| Sonia Pacheco
| Lydia Méndez Silva
|-
| Youth Affairs, Recreation and Sports
| Ramón Luis Cruz
| Narmito Ortíz
| Armando Franco
|-

Joint commissions

! scope=col style="text-align: left" | Name
! scope=col style="text-align: left" | President
! scope=col style="text-align: left" | Vice President
! scope=col style="text-align: left" | Secretary
|-
| Córdova Fernós Program of Congressional Internships
| Jaime Perelló
| Charlie Hernández
| vacant
|-
| Jorge Alberto Ramos Comas Legislative Internship Program
| Jaime Perelló
| Charlie Hernández
| Ramón Luis Cruz
|-
| Legislative Donations
| Tatito Hernández
| César Hernández Alfonzo
| Piti Gándara
|-
| Legislative Internship Program
| Jaime Perelló
| N/A
| N/A
|-
| Pilar Barbosa Internship Program in Education
| Jaime Perelló
| Charlie Hernández
| Brenda López de Arrarás
|-
| Public-Private Partnerships of Puerto Rico
| Jesús Santa Rodríguez
| Efraín de Jesús
| Carlos Bianchi Angleró
|-
| Special Reports from the Comptroller
| Nelson Torres Yordán
| César Hernández Alfonzo
| Carlos Vargas Ferrer
|-

Notable legislations
 Catch Up Act
 Commonwealth of Puerto Rico Employees Association Act of 2013
 Jobs Now Act

Notes

References

External links
 camaraderepresentantes.org - official site 

2013 in Puerto Rico
29